Rob Williams is an American independent film director, producer and screenwriter. In 2005, he co-founded the independent production house Guest House Films LLC with his partner Rodney Johnson. He released his debut long feature Long-Term Relationship in 2006. In 2007, he won the Grand Prize at the Rhode Island International Film Festival for his film Back Soon.

Williams is most famous for Make the Yuletide Gay, which won Best Narrative Feature at the 2009 FilmOut San Diego film festival. It also won the Jury Award for Best Men's Feature at the 2009 Long Island Gay & Lesbian Film Festival.

Filmography

Director / Producer / Screenwriter
 2006: Long-Term Relationship
 2007: Back Soon
 2008: 3-Day Weekend
 2009: Make the Yuletide Gay
 2010: Role/Play
 2012: The Men Next Door  
 2014: Out to Kill
 2016: Shared Rooms
 2017: Happiness Adjacent

Others
 2011: Regrets (short film - screenwriter)
 2012: Black Briefs (Video producer) 
 2012: Blue Briefs (producer)
 2013: The Far Flung Star (actor)

References

External links

American film directors
American film producers
Living people
LGBT film directors
LGBT film producers
American LGBT writers
Year of birth missing (living people)